Allen Christensen may refer to:

 Allen Christensen (footballer) (born 1991), Australian rules footballer
 Allen M. Christensen (born 1946), American politician from Utah